Colletotrichum capsici is a species of fungus and plant pathogen which causes leaf blight on Chlorophytum borivilianum, basil, chickpea and pepper as well as dieback in pigeonpea and anthracnose in poinsettia.

Hosts and symptoms

Colletotrichum capsici has a broad host range but prefers peppers, yams and eggplants. On chili peppers, Capsicum annuum L., C. capsici infect the stem, fruit, and leaves of the plant, causing anthracnose, die-back and ripe fruit rot. C. capsici infection tends to infect ripe red fruit and lead to the development of brown necrotic lesions containing concentric acervuli that will eventually appear black from the setae and sclerotia (Srinivasan, Vijayalakshmi Kothandaraman, Vaikuntavasan, & Rethinasamy, 2014). Additionally, the fruit content of capsaicin and oleoresin is reduced, which results in a decrease of its medicinal potency (Madhavan, Paranidharan, & Velazhahan, 2016).

Disease cycle
Dispersal of C. capsici spores is heavily reliant on water splashes onto host plants or wind-driven rain since water is required for spore germination and penetration into host (“Hot Pepper Disease - Anthracnose,” 2010). C. capsici has a necrotrophic lifestyle; therefore, after penetration of the host surface, it secretes many cell wall degrading enzymes into the environment between the host cells (Latunde-Dada, 2001). C. capsici overwinters as conidia or sclerotia, and spend the majority of their life in their conidial stage. Colletotrichum capsici, the asexual stage, consists of hooked shaped conidia produced from acervuli, a subepidermal fruiting body (Than et al., 2008). When grown on plates its colony morphology was observed to have white to grey, a dark green center, and dense, filamentous mycelium (Than et al., 2008).

Management

Limit water exposure
Since C. capsici need water for their spores to germinate, limiting water can hinder C. capsici infection. By reducing or don’t use overhead irrigation and mulching, you can reduce water exposure in general and back splash on the fruit.

Crop rotation
Since other solanaceous species can act as alternative hosts, rotation with non-solanaceous crops is recommended (“Hot Pepper Disease - Anthracnose,” 2010).

Hot water seed treatment
By exposing pepper seeds to 52˚C water for 30 minutes, shock with cold water, drying the seed, and adding a fungicide like thiram, the infection of C. capsici can be greatly decreased(“Hot Pepper Disease - Anthracnose,” 2010).

Inoculum control via seed inspection
Since the primary inoculum for C. capsici are seeds both internally and externally infected, it is important to inspect the seed and dispose of infected seed (Chandra Nayaka, S., Udaya Shankar, A. C., Niranjana, S. R., Prakash, H. S., & Mortensen, 2009). Recently, PCR has become a popular tool to indicate the presence of C. capsici in and on chilli pepper seeds due to its precision, speed, and a background in pathogen taxonomy for the individual conducting the PCR is not necessary considered to traditional blotter and pathogenicity tests (Srinivasan et al., 2014).

Host resistance
Chili pepper breeding programs in Taiwan, Korea, and Thailand have been known to collaborate in order to generate chili species with high C. capsici resistance (Mahasuk, Khumpeng, Wasee, Taylor, & Mongkolporn, 2009).Two well used resistant species are a local Korean variety of C. annuum known as Daepoong-cho and C. chinense, which are crossable species (Kim, Yoon, Do, & Park, 2007; Mahasuk et al., 2009). Additionally, the species C. baccatum is identified as C. capsici resistant (Mahasuk et al., 2009).

References
Chandra Nayaka, S., Udaya Shankar, A. C., Niranjana, S. R., Prakash, H. S., & Mortensen, C. N. (2009). Anthracnose disease of chilli pepper. University of Mysore Asian Seed Health Centre & Department of Studies in Applied Botany and Biotechnology Technical Bulletin, 1–14.
Hot Pepper Disease - Anthracnose. (2010). Retrieved November 16, 2016, from http://www.hortichain.org/site/en/publications/guidance/236-anthracnose.html
Kim, S., Yoon, J., Do, J., & Park, H. (2007). Resistance to anthracnose caused by Colletotrichum acutatum in chili pepper (Capsicum annuum L.). J Crop Sci Biotechnol, 10(4), 277–280. Retrieved from http://scholar.google.com/scholar?hl=en&btnG=Search&q=intitle:Resistance+to+Anthracnose+Caused+by+Colletotrichum+acutatum+in+Chili+Pepper+(+Capsicum+annuum+L+.)#0
Latunde-Dada, A. O. (2001). Colletotrichum: Tales of forcible entry, stealth, transient confinement and breakout. Molecular Plant Pathology, 2(4), 187–198. https://doi.org/10.1046/j.1464-6722.2001.00069.x
Madhavan, S., Paranidharan, V., & Velazhahan, R. (2016). Verlag Eugen Ulmer KG RAPD and virulence analyses of Colletotrichum capsici isolates from chilli ( Capsicum annuum ) Author ( s ): Srinivasan Madhavan, Vaikuntavasan Paranidharan and Rethinasamy Velazhahan Source : Journal of Plant Diseases and Protection, Vol . 117, No . 6 ( Dezember 2010 ), pp . 253- Published by : Verlag Eugen Ulmer KG Stable URL : http://www.jstor.org/stable/43229143 REFERENCES Linked references are available on JSTOR for this article : You may need to log into JSTOR to access the linked references ., 117(6).
Mahasuk, P., Khumpeng, N., Wasee, S., Taylor, P. W. J., & Mongkolporn, O. (2009). Inheritance of resistance to anthracnose (Colletotrichum capsici) at seedling and fruiting stages in chili pepper (Capsicum spp.). Plant Breeding, 128(6), 701–706. https://doi.org/10.1111/j.1439-0523.2008.01615.x
Srinivasan, M., Vijayalakshmi Kothandaraman, S., Vaikuntavasan, P., & Rethinasamy, V. (2014). Development of conventional and real-time PCR protocols for specific and sensitive detection of Colletotrichum capsici in chilli (Capsicum annuum L.). Phytoparasitica, 42(4), 437–444. article. https://doi.org/10.1007/s12600-013-0380-3
Than, P. P., Jeewon, R., Hyde, K. D., Pongsupasamit, S., Mongkolporn, O., & Taylor, P. W. J. (2008). Characterization and pathogenicity of Colletotrichum species associated with anthracnose on chilli (Capsicum spp.) in Thailand. Plant Pathology, 57(3), 562–572. https://doi.org/10.1111/j.1365-3059.2007.01782.x

External links
 USDA ARS Fungal Database

capsici
Fungal plant pathogens and diseases
Eudicot diseases
Fungi described in 1913
Taxa named by Hans Sydow